The governor of British Guiana was the Crown representative in British Guiana. The office existed from 1831 when the colonies of Demerara-Essequibo (see Demerara and Essequibo (colony)) and Berbice united as British Guiana until 1966 when Guyana attained independence.

Governors of British Guiana (1831–1966)

On 26 May 1966, the colony achieved independence from the United Kingdom as Guyana. After independence, the viceroy in Guyana was the Governor-General of Guyana.

See also

President of Guyana 
List of heads of state of Guyana
List of prime ministers of Guyana

References

 http://rulers.org/rulg2.html#guyana

Governors
 
British Guiana, Governors
Guiana